Crüe Ball is a 1992 pinball video game developed by American studio NuFX and published by Electronic Arts for the Sega Genesis. Themed to glam metal band Mötley Crüe, it features three of their songs: "Dr. Feelgood," "Live Wire," and "Home Sweet Home."

The game's prototype name was Twisted Flipper. The producer of the game, Richard Robbins, initially pursued the name Headbangers Ball, but MTV balked at a license and Mötley Crüe was added relatively late in development.

This game was designed by Mark Sprenger (artist for Space Shuttle, High Speed, and Diner) and Brian L. Schmidt (composer for Space Station and Black Knight 2000). The game was awarded the Sega Seal of Quality Award for Best Sound at the Consumer Electronics Show.

References

External links
 Crüe Ball at GameFAQs
 Crüe Ball at Sega-16
 Encyclopedia Bombastica Video at Giant Bomb
 
 

1992 video games
Band-centric video games
Electronic Arts games
Mötley Crüe
Video games based on musicians
NuFX games
Pinball video games
Sega Genesis games
Sega Genesis-only games
Multiplayer and single-player video games
Video games scored by Brian L. Schmidt
Video games developed in the United States